Chelan National Forest was established in Washington by the U.S. Forest Service on July 1, 1908 with  from a portion of Washington National Forest. On July 1, 1921 it absorbed the first Okanogan National Forest, but on March 23, 1955 the name was changed back to Okanogan.

References

External links
Forest History Society
Forest History Society:Listing of the National Forests of the United States Text from Davis, Richard C., ed. Encyclopedia of American Forest and Conservation History. New York: Macmillan Publishing Company for the Forest History Society, 1983. Vol. II, pp. 743-788.

Former National Forests of Washington (state)